ISO 1629, Rubber and latices – Nomenclature is an ISO standard that helps in classification and designation of basic or crude rubber in both dry and latex forms under a series of symbols or signs, based on the chemical composition of the polymer chain. This standardization becomes useful across industry and commerce thereby avoiding conflict in existing trademarks and names.

This standard was originally published in 1976, and was updated in 1987, 1995 (with amendments in 2007 and 2009) and 2013.

References
ISO Catalogue in the ISO website

01629